Tomasz Górkiewicz (born 28 January 1985 in Wadowice) is a Polish professional footballer who plays for Podbeskidzie II.

Career

Club
In the summer of 2009, he was loaned to MRKS Czechowice-Dziedzice on a half-year deal. He returned to Podbeskidzie in January 2010.

References

External links
 
 Tomasz Górkiewicz at Soccerway

1985 births
Living people
People from Wadowice County
Sportspeople from Lesser Poland Voivodeship
Association football defenders
Polish footballers
BBTS Bielsko-Biała players
Podbeskidzie Bielsko-Biała players
Polonia Bytom players
GKS Tychy players
MKS Kluczbork players
Ekstraklasa players
I liga players
II liga players
III liga players
IV liga players